Esküllő is the Hungarian name for two communes in Romania:

 Aștileu Commune, Bihor County
 Așchileu Commune, Cluj County